Walter Cope  was an 18th-century Anglican bishop in Ireland.

Cope was educated at Trinity College, Dublin.

Previously Dean of Dromore, he was nominated to be Bishop of Clonfert and Kilmacduagh on 27 January 1772 and consecrated on 15 March that year. Translated to Ferns and Leighlin on  9 August 1782, he died in post on 31 July 1787.

References

Deans of Dromore
Bishops of Clonfert and Kilmacduagh
Bishops of Ferns and Leighlin
1787 deaths
Year of birth unknown
Alumni of Trinity College Dublin